Jean-François Caron (born June 29, 1982) is a Canadian strongman and powerlifter from Les Hauteurs, Quebec, Canada.

Powerlifting
Caron holds a world record in the deadlift for the WPA Powerlifting organization. Caron deadlifted  on March 14, 2010, at the CPA Provincial Championships in Sherbrooke, Quebec in the  weight class, weighing in at only .

World's Strongest Man
Caron has competed eleven times in the World's Strongest Man contest: in 2008, 2011, 2012, 2014, 2015, 2016, 2017, 2018, 2019, 2020 and 2021. He has reached the final nine times: in 2012 and then each year between 2014 and 2021. He qualified 2nd in 2012 ahead of American athlete Derek Poundstone to reach the final. Caron's record in the finals has progressively got better: he placed 8th in 2012, 6th in 2015, 5th each year between 2016 and 2018, 4th in 2019 and 3rd in 2020 - his best finish. In the 2021 competition, JF returned to 5th place, having torn his hamstring during the first event.

Canada's Strongest Man
Caron has won Canada's Strongest Man a record 9 consecutive times, from 2011 to 2019. In 2016, he won all eight events in the contest, the only time a competitor has managed a clean sweep at the Canada's Strongest Man competition.

Strongman Champions League
Caron finished in 2nd place at the Strongman Champions League events in Canada and Latvia in 2011. Caron finished 2nd again at the 2011 SCL Finals in Sarajevo, Bosnia on Feb. 7, 2012, and 4th overall for the 2011/2012 SCL season.

North America's Strongest Man
In 2012, Caron won North America's Strongest Man after coming in 2nd place the two previous years.

World's Strongest Viking 2015
Caron came in third in this event.

Records

Hummer tire deadlift
Caron holds the Hummer Tire Deadlift world record –  (Shaw Classic 2020, World Record) Set at the 2020 Shaw Classic

Tire flip
Caron successfully flipped a  tire four times to set a new world record in the tire flip during the Rogue Record Breakers event at the Arnold Strongman Classic 2016.

Guinness record 2015
Caron broke the Guinness Book of Records for turning a Volkswagen 13 times in China. The previous record was 10 times by an Austrian strongman.

Personal records
 Elephant Bar Deadlift (with straps) –  (Arnold Classic 2018)
 Squat –  (Arnold Classic 2022)

References

Canadian strength athletes
Living people
Canadian powerlifters
1982 births
Male powerlifters